Kohlhaase is a German surname. Notable people with the surname include:

 Bill Kohlhaase, American music critic
 Jan Kohlhaase (born 1976), German mathematician
 Wolfgang Kohlhaase (1931–2022), German screenwriter and film director

See also
 Kohlhase

German-language surnames